Valea Crișului is a commune in Covasna County, Transylvania, Romania composed of two villages:
 Calnic / Kálnok
 Valea Crișului / Sepsikőröspatak

History 

It formed part of the Székely Land region of the historical Transylvania province. Until 1918, the village belonged to the Háromszék County of the Kingdom of Hungary. After the Treaty of Trianon of 1920, it became part of Romania. In 2004; the village of Arcuș split away from Valea Crișului to form an independent commune.

Demographics

The commune has an absolute Székely Hungarian majority. According to the 2002 census, it has a population of 2,185, of which 98.44% or 2,151 are Hungarian.

Points of interest

There is a historic Roman Catholic church at Valea Crișului. In its semicircular apse dating from the era of the Arpad dynasty, there are fragments of medieval frescoes considered to be of the 14th century. Its smaller bell was made in Brasov in 1512. The patronal feast of the church is on Trinity Sunday.

The ancestral castle of the family of Count Kálnoky. The ancient Renaissance castle, built at the cusp of the 17th century, has been renovated several times.

There are man-made caves in the rocky slopes of the Fenyős peak, which in winter serve as a refuge for insects and moths. The longest among them is the Ploti cave (14 m).

People
 Kőröspataki Kálnoky family

Calnic

The neighboring village of Calnic (3 km) belongs administratively to Valea Crișului.

The masterpiece of wood carving is the 18th-century bell tower at Calnic, covered by two wooden. The Unitarian church next to it dates from 1781. Not a single iron nail was used in its construction. Both structures are listed monuments.

The Unitarian church at Calnic, dating to 1674, is a historic monument. Its floral-patterned coffered ceiling dates from the same century. Its two carved portals are the work of folk artists Dénes Nemes and András Bálint.

Gallery

Valea Crișului

Calnic

References

External links
Valea Crişului (Sepsiköröspatak), PowerPoint Presentation
Valea Crişului (Sepsiköröspatak), Pictures
Churches in Valea Crișului (Sepsiköröspatak)
Calnic (Kálnok), PowerPoint Presentation 
Calnic (Kálnok), Pictures

Communes in Covasna County
Localities in Transylvania